The Green Party of Quebec (GPQ) (PVQ) is a Quebec political party whose platform is the promotion of green politics.  It has not won any seats in the National Assembly of Quebec.  Its platform is oriented towards promotion of green values, sustainable development, and participatory democracy.  

The Green Party of Quebec is a coalition of activists and citizens for whom environmental questions are a priority. They believe that the government should help in creating a green, just, democratic and equal society. Their main principles are inspired from the Global Greens Charter which revolves around six main ideas: ecological wisdom, social justice, participatory democracy, nonviolence, sustainability and respect for diversity.

It received 0.76% of the popular vote in the 2022 Quebec general election.

History

First Green Party of Quebec (1985–1998)
A first version of the Green Party of Québec was founded in the 1980s and had candidates in the 1985, 1989 and 1994 Quebec general elections. The 1989 elections results were at the time the strongest showing for any Green Party in Canada. On average, candidates collected 5.55% of votes in contested seats. Although the party had a small budget, it attempted to run a province-wide campaign with organizers from Montreal, Québec City and Sherbrooke, as well as some relatively independent local campaigns in rural ridings. Many meetings were held at Le Commensal restaurant in Montréal, a strong supporter. Attempts were made to involve the various environmental groups, but most shied away from officially supporting the PVQ in order to maintain political neutrality and protect financial interests. In the party structure of 1989, sovereignty and economical neutrality were promoted rather than left-wing policies, under the slogan of "not left or right but forward". This caused some strife within the party, as many members were more left-leaning.

The party disintegrated in 1994 due to its leader, Jean Ouimet, and many of his colleagues leaving for the Parti Québécois. Ouimet, a strong sovereigntist, maintained a party wholly independent of the federal Green Party during his leadership. Members of the Green Party of Canada formed an organization called the Green Party of Canada in Quebec, a predominantly anglophone entity that nominated federal candidates only. There was open antipathy between Ouimet and the GPCQ's leader, Rolf Bramann. (Neither was affiliated with Montreal's municipal Green Party of the time, Écologie-Montreal, led by Dmitri Roussopolis.) At the same time as the PVQ began to collapse due to Ouimet's departure, Rolf Bramann was removed from his position. This led to a precipitous decline in federal organization in the province contemporaneous with the collapse of the provincial Greens.

It lost its recognition as an official political party in 1998 when it ran no candidates in the 1998 Quebec general election. (Quebec law at the time required parties to run at least 20 candidates to maintain their official status. The Supreme Court of Canada ruled minimum candidate laws unconstitutional in 2003.)

Current Green Party of Quebec (since 2001) 

The second (and current) version of the PVQ was founded in 2001 by members of the Green Party of Canada in Quebec after receiving more support in Quebec in the 2000 federal election than they had expected. The founding meeting, in the basement of the Montreal Biodome, was attended by about 20 people, and it contested the 2003 provincial election with few candidates and almost no money.

In 2002, three leftist political parties (Rassemblement pour l'alternative progressiste, Parti de la démocratie socialiste and Parti Communiste du Québec) merged to form the Union des forces progressistes. The PVQ pledged to try to avoid running candidates in ridings where there was a UFP candidate, although it reserved the right to run anywhere it wanted to (even ridings with a UFP candidate), and did not merge with the UFP. In May 2006, the Party pledged to stay independent after several appeals to join Québec solidaire, the UFP's successor.

Scott McKay was elected as party leader in 2006. The party had its most successful showing ever in the 2007 general election, placing fourth with just under four per cent of the popular vote. Unlike the previous version of the party, the new version did not adopt a position on whether Quebec should become sovereign. As a result, it was most competitive in western Montreal where there was a drop in Liberal Party support but little enthusiasm for sovereigntist alternatives such as the Parti Québécois. The Green Party placed second or third in the popular vote in some western Montreal ridings.

In 2008, the PVQ held a leadership review, during which Guy Rainville defeated Scott McKay. McKay then joined the Parti Québécois and was elected as an MNA in the 2008 election, while the Green Party itself fell to two per cent of the popular vote, fifth place among political parties and the only one of the top five parties not to win a seat in the National Assembly. On 10 September 2010, Rainville announced that he would not seek another two-year term as leader. Claude Sabourin narrowly defeated party president Paul-André Martineau for the position. Martineau had been president of the Green Party since 2006, except for a brief period in 2008. He has a Bachelor of Arts degree in Political Science from the University of Montreal (1985) and a bachelor's degree in business administration from HEC Montréal (2001). At the time of the leadership contest, he was working in information technology and pursuing a specialized graduate degree in environment and sustainable development from the Université du Québec à Montréal. He has not run for federal or provincial office.

In April 2012, the leader Claude Sabourin went to a meeting in La Pinière riding, where he recruited four future candidates, two of which – Alex Tyrrell & Marc André Beauchemin – would later run for the leadership of the party. Overall the party lost over half its support from the previous election, obtaining 1% of the overall popular vote and running candidates in only 66 of Quebec's 125 ridings during the September 4, 2012 election. Sabourin finished fifth in NDG riding with 1,531 votes and 5.77% of the vote. Alex Tyrrell finished third in Jacques Cartier with 1,522 votes and 4.54% of the vote.

Claude Sabourin resigned as party leader on Sunday, 24 February 2013 at the Green Party of Quebec convention held that weekend in Montreal. Jean Cloutier was elected interim leader that same day.

On 21 September 2013, Alex Tyrrell was elected leader of the PVQ defeating other leadership candidates Patricia Domingos, Marc-André Beauchemin and Pierre-Étienne Loignon. Another candidate Lisa Julie Cahn had withdrawn earlier in the race. At the age of 25 years Mr. Tyrrell became the youngest current party leader in Quebec politics.

The Parti vert du Québec intended to diversify its policies in view of the 2014 general elections, in order to increase its support.  Tyrrell explained that the PVQ would be an eco-socialist group. Thus, the environment would remain its priority but the party would also defend a public health system and would propose among other things a universal program of dental care for all Quebecers. It is also in favour of free public transport.

In December 2019, the group Reform GPQ launched a petition asking for a general assembly to be held where a vote of confidence would take place in the leadership of Alex Tyrrell. The members accused him of having voted himself a salary and not having organized a vote of confidence. In October 2020, six members of the party's National Executive removed their trust in Alex Tyrrell's leadership and demanded his resignation, accusing him of poorly preparing the party for the 2022 election and of being responsible for the party's poor relations with his federal equivalent, the Green Party of Canada. Alex Tyrrell obtained 64.6% (with a participation rate of 65.5%) in the following vote of confidence. On October 5, 2020, five members of the Executive resigned, saying that the result were not good enough, that the process was tainted by multiple problems and that the leader acted in bad faith throughout the whole process. In January 2021, Alex Tyrrell expelled the five members of the National Executive and members Chad Walcott and Catherine Polson from the party, accusing them of harming the party's progress.

Leaders

Electoral results

By-elections

See also 
 List of Green party leaders in Canada
 List of Green politicians who have held office in Canada
 List of Quebec general elections
 Political parties in Quebec
 Politics of Quebec

References

External links 

  (French)
 Twitter account

 
Green parties in North America
1985 establishments in Quebec
2001 establishments in Quebec
Environmental organizations based in Quebec
Non-interventionist parties
Organizations based in Montreal
Political parties established in 1983
Political parties disestablished in 1998
Political parties established in 2001
Provincial political parties in Quebec